Peter Roberts may refer to:

 Peter Roberts (priest) (1760–1819), Welsh Anglican divine and antiquary
 Sir Peter Roberts, 3rd Baronet (1912–1985), British Conservative Party MP
 Peter Scawen Watkinson Roberts (1917–1979), English recipient of the Victoria Cross
 Peter Roberts (activist) (1924–2006), British animal welfare activist and the founder of Compassion in World Farming
 Peter Roberts (cricketer) (born 1952), Australian cricketer
 Peter Roberts (councillor), British politician, Leader of Rochdale Borough Council from 1997–2006
Peter Roberts (inventor), inventor of the quick release socket wrench
, former Canadian ambassador to Romania
, Australian ambassador to East Timor